Portugal competed at the 1928 Summer Olympics in Amsterdam, Netherlands.

A delegation of thirty one competitors participated in eight sports, with the fencing team grabbing the second Olympic medal for Portugal. Most of the competitors were part of the debutant Portuguese Olympic football team.

Medalists

Athletics

Men's 100m:
 J. Artur Prata Rebelo de Lima — 1st round: 4th (12th heat)

Men's 200m:
 J. Artur Prata Rebelo de Lima — 1st round: 4th (13th heat)

Men's 3000m Steeplechase:
 Henrique Santos — qualifying round: 7th (2nd heat)

Men's 110m Hurdles:
 J. Palhares Costa — 1st round: 4th (9th heat)

Equestrian

Men's Individual Jumping:
 L. Ivens Ferraz — 15th (4 faults)
 Hélder de Souza — 16th (4 faults)
 José Mouzinho — 19th (4 faults)

Men's Team Jumping:
 José Mouzinho, Hélder de Souza, L. Ivens Ferraz and J. Frois de Almeida — 6th (12 faults)

Fencing

Men's Individual Foil:
 Sebastião Herédia — 1st round: 5th (poule 4)

Men's Individual Sword:
 Frederico Paredes — semifinalist (poule 5)
 Henrique da Silveira — 2nd round: non qualified (poule 3)
 Paulo d'Eça Leal — 2nd round: non qualified (poule 2)

Men's Team Sword:
 Frederico Paredes, Henrique da Silveira, João Sassetti, Jorge de Paiva, Mário de Noronha and Paulo d'Eça Leal — 3rd

Football

Men's Tournament:
 Carlo Alves, Armando Martins, Augusto Silva, Óscar de Carvalho, César de Matos, Tamanqueiro, Anibal José, João Santos, José Manuel Martins, Liberto dos Santos, Valdemar Mota, Pepe, Ramos, António Roquete, Cipriano Santos, Tavares, Jorge Gomes Vieira and Vítor Silva — quarterfinalists (5th - 8th)

Modern pentathlon

Men's Tournament:
 Sebastião de Freitas Branco de Herédia — 31st (133 points)
 Shooting — 36th (132 points)
 Swimming — 18th (6.01 min)
 Fencing — 20th
 Cross-country — 27th (16.40,2 min)
 Horse-riding — 32nd

Sailing

Men's 6m:
 Frederico Guilherme Burnay, Ernesto Vieira de Mendonça, António Guedes de Herédia and Carlos Bleck — 12th

Weightlifting

Men's Feather Weight (–60 kg):
 A. Pereira — 11th

Wrestling

Men's Greco-Roman Feather Weight (58–60 kg):
 B. Esteves Araújo — 3rd round

Officials
Manuel da Costa Latino (chief of mission, athletics, equestrian, fencing, sailing)
P. Duro (athletics)
J. Formosinho Simões (equestrian, modern pentathlon, sailing)
L. Ivens Ferraz (fencing)
J. Frois de Almeida (fencing)
R. Ayres de Magalhães (fencing)
Hélder Martinez (fencing)
Cardoso (fencing)
C. de Mello (weightlifting)
J. Pontes (weightlifting)

References

External links
Official Olympic Reports
International Olympic Committee results database

Nations at the 1928 Summer Olympics
1928 Summer Olympics
1928 in Portuguese sport